DeBoy or Deboy is a surname. Notable people with the surname include:

 Curtis Deboy (born 1990), Australian rules football umpire
 Paul DeBoy (born 1955), American actor
 PJ DeBoy (born Paul J. DeBoy in 1971), American actor 
 Steven J. DeBoy Sr. (born 1956), Democratic member of the Maryland House of Delegates